Alexander Alexandrovich Sablukov (1783–1857) was a Russian Lieutenant General, engineer and inventor. Sablukov is credited with the invention of the centrifugal fan (1832) and contribution to the development of the centrifugal pump.

See also 
 List of Russian inventors

References 

Inventors from the Russian Empire
Imperial Russian Army generals
1783 births
1857 deaths
Burials at Tikhvin Cemetery